Daisy Florence Ridgley (sometimes written Ridgeley and later Pell), born 9 January 1909, date of death unknown) was an English athlete who competed in the 1930 Women's World Games.

Biography
Daisy Florence Ridgley was born in Essex. When she took up athletics, she competed mainly at 200 metres but also at 100 metres. In 1923, she began studying at Edmonton County School, which is now in the London Borough of Enfield in north London.

Ridgley attended the 1928 Summer Olympics in Amsterdam, but there was no women's 200 metre event.

At the 1930 Women's World Games in Prague she was a member, along with Ethel Scott, Eileen Hiscock and Ivy Walker, of the British 4×100 metre relay team which won the silver medal.

In 1931, she won the silver medal at the Olympics of Grace in Florence in the 100 metre race.

In 1938, she married Reginald Pell in Edmonton, Middlesex. According to the 1939 England and Wales Register, she at the time was an art teacher in Wembley.

References

1909 births
Year of death missing
English female sprinters
People educated at Edmonton County School
Women's World Games medalists